Czernice may refer to the following places:
Czernice, Łódź Voivodeship (central Poland)
Czernice, Masovian Voivodeship (east-central Poland)
Czernice, Podlaskie Voivodeship (north-east Poland)
Czernice, Greater Poland Voivodeship (west-central Poland)
Czernice, Choszczno County in West Pomeranian Voivodeship (north-west Poland)
Czernice, Pyrzyce County in West Pomeranian Voivodeship (north-west Poland)